Geraldine "Gerri" Tilden is an American curler.

At the national level, she is a United States women's champion curler (1986).

Teams

References

External links
 

Living people
American female curlers
American curling champions
Year of birth missing (living people)
Place of birth missing (living people)